Paitoon Pumrat, stage name Robert Sai-kwan (โรเบิร์ต สายควัน), nickname Mang (หมั่ง) (7 November 1965 – 19 September 2020) was a Thai comedian and actor.

Early life
He was born in a slum in Bang Khen District, on 7 November 1965. His parents moved to United States, so he and his younger-sister  lived with their grandmother. His early life was very dark. He was not educated, and he used drugs.

Career
He began as a humble ticket boy and met with Noo Klongtoey, one of the famous Thai comedians. He started in comedy on stage in 1980s with the persuasion of Sayan Dokmadan. He was a comedian until he returned to using drugs when persuaded by a friend and was jailed for drug possession. Since he wanted another chance in the comedy industry, he gave up the bad life and went for drug treatment, until he was finally cured, and he got a chance from Chatchai Chamnienkul to return to the comedy industry again.

He has many films  which include Saranae Hen Phee, Khun Bunlue, E Leam Sing etc. He was a regular actor of Thai popular sitcoms Laugh Co.Ultd. (Borisat Ha Mai Chamkat).

Illness and death
He was healing from lung cancer since August 2020, and seemed to be improving by 18 September 2020. However, the doctor found that he had tuberculosis and his health had deteriorated. He died on 19 September 2020, aged 54.

Personal life
He married Jaew Phumrat, and they had two daughters.

Filmography

Films
 2008 - Saranae Hen Phee
 2018 - 
 Bikeman
 Khun Bunlue
 2019 - Bikeman 2
 2020 -
 Luamg Phee Kap E Pob
 E Leam Sing

Sitcoms
 2017 to 2020 - Laugh Co.Ultd.

References

1965 births
2020 deaths
Paitoon Pumrat
Paitoon Pumrat
Paitoon Pumrat
Paitoon Pumrat
Deaths from lung cancer
Paitoon Pumrat
Paitoon Pumrat
Paitoon Pumrat
Paitoon Pumrat
Paitoon Pumrat
Deaths from cancer in Thailand
21st-century deaths from tuberculosis